The Baribis Fault is a geological feature located in the northern part of Java.

Characteristics 
The fault is estimated at 100 km long and stretches from Purwakarta to Lebak Regency, moving at a rate of 5 mm a year. It is a thrust fault formed during the Pliocene era. It divides into two segments.

Fault activity 
Half of the fault is locked but it caused a large earthquake in 1834 which resulted in five deaths and serious damage in West Java. It sometimes causes small earthquakes.

Hazard 
The fault passes through the Jakarta metropolitan area, which has a population of more than 30 million, where an earthquake could cause huge loss of life and damage.

See also 
List of faults in Indonesia 
List of earthquakes in Indonesia
1834 Java earthquake

References 

Geology of Indonesia
Seismic faults of Indonesia